The Cross of Freedom and Solidarity (Krzyż Wolności i Solidarności) was established on 5 August 2010, to honor members of the democratic opposition in Poland who between the years 1956 and 1989 were killed, seriously wounded or injured, arrested, imprisoned or interned for at least 30 days, who lost jobs or were expelled from school or university for at least 6 months as a result of their activities for the benefit of a free and democratic Poland. Individuals who are found having collaborated with the communist regime may not be awarded.

Design
The cross is a silver, red enameled Greek cross, similar to that of the Order of the Cross of Independence and the Cross of Independence of 1930. It is inscribed "WOLNOŚĆ I SOLIDARNOŚĆ" (freedom and solidarity) across the horizontal arms. In the center of the cross carved stylized image of the White Eagle. The reverse side of the cross is smooth. The cross is 42 mm in diameter.

The Cross of Freedom and Solidarity is suspended from a white ribbon, 38 mm wide. Symmetrically arranged along the edges of the ribbon are gold and crimson stripes each 3 mm wide.

Recipients

References

See also
 Polish awards and decorations
 Order of the Cross of Independence 
 Cross of Independence

Orders, decorations, and medals of Poland
Awards established in 2010